The Philippine Independence Medal is a military award and decoration of the Republic of the Philippines which was created by order of the Philippine Army Headquarters on 3 July 1946 as the Philippine Independence Ribbon. The medal was added in 1968. The medal recognizes those members of the military who had participated in multiple Philippine Commonwealth military operations during the years of World War II.

Award criteria
To be awarded the Philippine Independence Medal, a service member must have previously received both the Philippine Defense Medal and the Philippine Liberation Medal (authority for wear must be recorded before 24 November 1954). The award criteria effectively awarded the medal to anyone who had participated in both the initial resistance against Japanese invasion and also in the campaigns to liberate the Philippines from Japanese occupation from October 1944 to September 1945.

The decoration was also authorized for award to the United States and other foreign militaries, with a number of retroactive awards presented between 1945 and 1948. A famous American recipient was General of the Army Douglas MacArthur.

The Philippine Independence Medal was originally awarded as a service ribbon only, and it was not until 1968, that a full-sized medal was authorized and added by President Ferdinand Marcos.

Notable recipients
 Ramon A. Alcaraz
 Frank A. Armstrong
 Donald Blackburn
 Jose Calugas
 Edwin A. Doss
 Richard W. Fellows
 Leslie Fernandez
 Wendell Fertig
 Harold K. Johnson
 Emilio S. Liwanag
 Douglas MacArthur
 Paul J. Mueller
 Emmett O'Donnell, Jr.
 Lorenzo Sabin
 Manuel F. Segura
 Arthur D. Simons
 Jonathan M. Wainwright (general)

See also
 Awards and decorations of the Armed Forces of the Philippines

References

Citations

Bibliography
 The AFP Adjutant General, AFP Awards and Decorations Handbook, 1995, 1997, OTAG.

Military awards and decorations of the Philippines